|}

The Prix d'Hédouville is a Group 3 flat horse race in France open to thoroughbreds aged four years or older. It is run over a distance of 2,400 metres (about 1½ miles) at Longchamp in May.

History
The event is named in memory of Charles d'Hédouville (1809–1890), a long-serving member of the Société d'Encouragement. It was established in 1890, and was originally held at Chantilly. It was initially open to horses aged three or older and contested over 2,000 metres.

The race was abandoned throughout World War I, with no running from 1915 to 1918. It was staged at Longchamp in 1919 and 1920, and returned to Chantilly in 1921. It was cancelled in 1940, and took place at Le Tremblay in 1943 and 1944.

The event was extended to 2,400 metres in 1954, and cut to 1,800 metres the following year. Its original length was restored in 1957, and it reverted to 2,400 metres in 1962. It was discontinued in 1965.

The Prix d'Hédouville was relaunched as a three-year-olds' race in 1972. The first two editions were held at Longchamp, and the final running was at Chantilly in 1974.

The present format of the Prix d'Hédouville was introduced in 1978. From this point it was run at Longchamp, and restricted to horses aged four or older. It was given Group 3 status in 1985.

Records
Most successful horse (2 wins):

 Callistrate – 1894, 1895
 Champaubert – 1897, 1898
 Caius – 1904, 1905
 Moulins la Marche – 1908, 1909
 Nino – 1927, 1928
 Djebel – 1941, 1942
 Violoncelle – 1950, 1951
 Robore – 1989, 1990
 Allied Powers – 2010, 2012

Leading jockey (6 wins):
 Christophe Soumillon – Martaline (2003), Fracassant (2005), Bellamy Cay (2006), Ivory Land (2011), Spiritjim (2014), One Foot In Heaven (2016)

Leading trainer (10 wins):
 André Fabre – Luth Dancer (1988), Glorify (1991), First Magnitude (2000), Martaline (2003), Short Pause (2004), Fracassant (2005), Bellamy Cay (2006), Champs Elysees (2007), Not Just Swing (2008), Pirika (2013)

Leading owner (12 wins):
 Marcel Boussac – Ramus (1922), Zariba (1923), Irismond (1925), Goyescas (1933), Corrida (1936), Cillas (1939), Djebel (1941, 1942), Hierocles (1943), Ardan (1945), Narses (1947), Djeddah (1949)

Winners since 1979

Earlier winners

 1890: Le Sancy
 1891: Chalet
 1892: Gouverneur
 1893: Fra Angelico
 1894: Callistrate
 1895: Callistrate
 1896: Le Justicier
 1897: Champaubert
 1898: Champaubert
 1899: Gardefeu
 1900: Multiplicateur
 1901: Semendria
 1902: Codoman
 1903: La Camargo
 1904: Caius
 1905: Caius
 1906: Prestige
 1907: King James
 1908: Moulins la Marche
 1909: Moulins la Marche
 1910: Radis Rose
 1911: Italus
 1912: Calvados III
 1913: Wagram
 1914: Sardanapale
 1915–18: no race
 1919: Mihran
 1920: Caroly
 1921: Viburnum
 1922: Ramus
 1923: Zariba
 1924: Scaramouche
 1925: Irismond
 1926: Ptolemy
 1927: Nino
 1928: Nino
 1929: Guy Fawkes
 1930: Mysarch
 1931: Roi de Trefle
 1932: Macaroni
 1933: Goyescas
 1934: Rentenmark
 1935: Rarity
 1936: Corrida
 1937: Sanguinetto
 1938: Sylvanire
 1939: Cillas
 1940:  no race
 1941: Djebel
 1942: Djebel
 1943: Hierocles
 1944: Un Gaillard
 1945: Ardan
 1946:
 1947: Narses
 1948: Tharsis
 1949: Djeddah
 1950: Violoncelle
 1951: Violoncelle
 1952: Gerocourt
 1953: Cosmos / Skyrocket *
 1954: Peppermint
 1955: Marjolet
 1956: Clairvoie
 1957: Brisemaille
 1958: Primesautier
 1959: Super
 1960: Elven
 1961: Night and Day
 1962: Sourire
 1963: Rafai
 1964: Le Vermontois
 1965–71: no race
 1972: Wanderer
 1973: Kalpour
 1974: Flushing
 1975–77: no race
 1978: Rex Magna **
</div>
* The 1953 race was a dead-heat and has joint winners.** Crow finished first in 1978, but he was relegated to second place following a stewards' inquiry.

See also
 List of French flat horse races

References

 France Galop / Racing Post:

 france-galop.com – A Brief History: Prix d'Hédouville.
 galop.courses-france.com – Prix d'Hédouville – Palmarès depuis 1980.
 galopp-sieger.de – Prix d'Hédouville.
 horseracingintfed.com – International Federation of Horseracing Authorities – Prix d'Hédouville (2017).
 pedigreequery.com – Prix d'Hédouville – Longchamp.

Open middle distance horse races
Longchamp Racecourse
Horse races in France
1890 establishments in France
Recurring sporting events established in 1890